Korsakovsky District is an administrative district (raion) of Sakhalin Oblast, Russia; one of the seventeen in the oblast. Municipally, it is incorporated as Korsakovsky Urban Okrug. It is located in the southeast of the oblast. Its administrative center is the town of Korsakov. Population (excluding the administrative center):

References

Notes

Sources

Districts of Sakhalin Oblast